Corey–Nicolaou macrolactonization is a named reaction of organic chemistry, for the synthesis of lactones from hydroxy acids, found in 1974. The reaction should take place in a polar aprotic solvent with mild conditions, with the use of 2,2'-Dipyridyldisulfide and triphenylphosphine.

Mechanism 
The hydroxy acid first reacts with the 2,2'-Dipyridyldisulfide to form the corresponding 2-pyridinethiol ester, and after a proton transfer, the alkoxide attacks the carbonyl carbon, forming a tetrahedral transition state, before resolving back to the desired lactone and 2-pyridinethione.

See also
Shiina macrolactonization
Ružička reaction

References